Fabrizio Cicchitto (born 26 October 1940) is an Italian politician, whose career has followed a trajectory from radical socialism to centre-right reformism.

Biography
Fabrizio Cicchitto entered politics in the early 1960s, supporting the Riccardo Lombardi-led Marxist left-wing of the Italian Socialist Party (PSI) and then becoming secretary of the party's youth organization (Federazione Giovanile Socialista Italiana; Italian Young Socialist Federation). Cicchitto also became sympathetic to Eurocommunism and the Historic Compromise path taken by the Italian Communist Party (PCI), while being highly critical of Christian Democracy (DC) itself, as well as of the American CIA and the Italian Servizio Informazioni Difesa. According to him, DC would have exploited the Red Brigades' activities and the Aldo Moro case to cut off relations with the PCI.

In 1981, he confessed to being a member of the masonic lodge Propaganda Due (P2). Shortly after this move, Cicchitto was excluded from the Socialist Party. Readmitted toward the end of the 1980s, he followed the policies of Bettino Craxi and held minor posts throughout the Mani pulite-Tangentopoli scandals that saw the disestablishment of most Italian political parties. Cicchitto joined Silvio Berlusconi's centre-right party Forza Italia (FI), leading its social-democratic wing We Blue Reformers. He had been a Socialist member of either the Italian Chamber of Deputies or the Italian Senate for three successive terms. He is currently the vice-president of Forza Italia's group in the chamber, and national deputy-coordinator of the party from 2003.

He has contributed to steps taken by Italy in its adoption of the European Monetary System and the Maastricht Treaty, and has taken part in debates over privatization in the country. Since 1998, Cicchitto contributes editorials to Il Giornale, and is currently a member of the editorial staff for Avanti!.

In November 2009 he founded Reformism and Freedom (REL), a "reformist" and mainly social-democratic think tank within the People of Freedom (PdL). After the split of PdL, Cicchitto joined the New Centre-Right (NCD) party. Since 2017 he has been a member of the moderate conservative Popular Alternative grouping, which was established following the dissolution of the NCD.

References

Works
 Il pensiero economico cattolico
 Politiche nuove per l'industria italiana
 Dall'utopia al potere
 Rapporto pubblico e privato e modernizzazione dell' industria italiana
 Rodolfo Morandi, il partito e la democrazia industriale
 Il governo Craxi
 Storia del centro-sinistra
 Riflessioni sulla fine della prima repubblica e sulla sinistra di governo
 De Gasperi e Togliatti, due protagonisti
 La DC dopo il primo ventennio
 Le scelte dei democratici
 Dal centro-sinistra all'alternativa
 Il grande inganno

1940 births
Living people
Writers from Rome
Italian Socialist Party politicians
Socialist Party (Italy, 1996) politicians
Forza Italia politicians
The People of Freedom politicians
New Centre-Right politicians
Popular Alternative politicians
21st-century Italian politicians
Operation Gladio
Italian economists
Italian essayists
Italian male writers
Italian journalists
Italian male journalists
Members of the Chamber of Deputies (Italy)
Male essayists